Ernest Alfred Walton (7 April 1875 – 23 August 1946) was an Australian rules footballer in the VFA and the Victorian Football League (VFL).

Walton made his debut for the Carlton Football Club in Round 1 of the 1894 season, becoming a regular in the team, and was playing for them when the Victorian Football League began in 1897. He captained the Blues in 1898 and 1899, and represented Victoria in 1899 and 1902. Walton also had stints as vice captain in 1897, 1900 and 1903.

Walton maintained connections with the club after his retirement, becoming treasurer of the club in 1911 and serving until 1913, as well as being an official in other capacities. His 169 matches was a club record until passed by team-mate Fred Elliott in Round 17 of 1909.

References

External links
Ernie Walton at Blueseum.

External links
 
 

Carlton Football Club (VFA) players
Carlton Football Club players
Australian rules footballers from Geelong
1875 births
1946 deaths